In mathematics, Weibel's conjecture gives a criterion for vanishing of negative algebraic K-theory groups. Previously partial cases had been proven by 
, 
, 
, 
, and 
.

Statement of the conjecture
Weibel's conjecture asserts that for a Noetherian scheme X of finite Krull dimension d, the K-groups vanish in degrees < −d:

 

and asserts moreover a homotopy invariance property for negative K-groups

References

 

Algebraic geometry
K-theory